TCDD E14000 were electric multiple unit used by the Turkish State Railways on their commuter rail services around Istanbul, Ankara and Izmir. The 75 units were delivered starting in 1979 to supplement the aging E8000 units that were in use on the European Istanbul service, when the other commuter train services were electrified.

Though the units still remain in service, they are heavily used and show signs of wear. It is not uncommon for doors not to shut, and TCDD is planning a major replacement of the stock with the Marmaray upgrade that is in progress.

External links
 Trains on Turkey page on E14000

Turkish railways electric multiple units
25 kV AC multiple units